Tottles was a character from Lewis Carroll's novel Sylvie and Bruno Concluded (1893), the second volume following on from Sylvie and Bruno (1889). It includes a stanza on What Tottles Meant in Chapter 13.

Tottles the Bear, with a name derived from the Lewis Carroll character, is a fictional bear who features in children's stories. He was originated by Humphry Bowen. He has a girlfriend called Tutu and a best friend called Tuttles.

A book by Gina Hughes entitled Tommy Tottlebears Days Before Christmas was published in 2000.

See also

 Tootles, one of the lost boys in Peter Pan by J. M. Barrie (1904)

References

External links
 Chapter 13: What Tottles Meant
 Full text from Archive.org

Literary characters introduced in 1893
Children's short stories
Bears in literature
Fictional bears
Characters in children's literature
Lewis Carroll characters